Pembecik can refer to:

 Pembecik, Aydıncık
 Pembecik, Çorum